Zinc finger protein 853 is a protein that in humans is encoded by the ZNF853 gene.

References

Further reading 

Human proteins